Fred Gainous was born in 1947, and his hometown is Tallahassee, Florida. He received his bachelor's degree from Florida A & M University back in 1969, and his Master's and Doctorate from the University of Florida.

Gainous served as President of Florida A & M University from 2002 - 2004. Before this position he was the Chancellor of the Alabama College System's Department of Postsecondary Education. He was also the associate vice president of St. Petersburg College.

References

Presidents of Florida A&M University
University of Florida alumni
Living people
1947 births
Date of birth missing (living people)